The Danish UNIX systems User Group (DKUUG) is a computer user group around UNIX, which was the first Internet provider in Denmark and which created and maintained the .dk internet domain for Denmark. Founded 18 November 1983, DKUUG is a primary advisor on the Danish UNIX and Open Standards use. The group is active in the standards processes for UNIX, POSIX, the Internet, the World Wide Web, and Open Document Format.

History 
The Danish UNIX User Group was founded on 18 November 1983 with the purpose of promoting UNIX and providing Internet access to the Danish academic community and the whole of Denmark. An offshoot of the EUUG, the DKUUG membership was originally 41 people from the Danish academic and business computing industry. Founder Keld Simonsen of the Datalogisk Institut at Copenhagen University served as group foreman from 1983 to 1997. It formed a commercial subsidiary, DKnet, organized as the Danish affiliate of the EUnet network.

In 1996, DKnet was purchased by the Danish PTT TeleDanmark in a private transaction for 20 million DKK.

During the 2000s, the organization has been the subject of internal disagreement and infighting among board members.

See also 
 .dk

References

Further reading
(Danish) Keld Simonsen, "En historie om Keld og DKUUG" (A History of Keld and DKUUG), dkuug.dk,
(Danish) Keld Simonsen, "DKUUG 30 år - Opstart og resultater" (DKUUG - 30 years - Creation and results) (2013-11-18)

External links 
 Official DKUUG website  

1983 establishments in Denmark
Organizations established in 1983
User groups

sv:Unix time